Rifka Lodeizen (born 16 October 1972) is a Dutch actress.

Career 

Lodeizen made her debut with a small role in the 1991 film The Province. She was discovered by film director Eddy Terstall and she played a role in his 1996 film Hufters & hofdames.

Lodeizen won the Golden Calf for Best Actress award at the 2009 Netherlands Film Festival for her role in the film Can Go Through Skin directed by Esther Rots.

She also won the Golden Calf for Best Actress in a Television Drama award in 2012 for her role in the television series Overspel by Frank Ketelaar. She also won this award in 2019 for her role in the television series Judas.

She was also nominated for a Golden Calf award for her roles in the films Tonio (2016) and Disappearance (2017).

Lodeizen also wrote the script for Kleine IJstijd (2017) in collaboration with Paula van der Oest.

In 2021, she appeared in the television series Maud & Babs.

Personal life 

Lodeizen is a daughter of Dutch artist Frank Lodeizen. At birth, she was given the name Rifke but as a teenager she decided to change her name to Rifka, the name of her father's sister. Her paternal grandmother was Jewish.

She has two daughters.

Selected filmography 

 1991: The Province
 1998: Het 14e kippetje (The 14th Chicken)
 1999: De Boekverfilming (The Book film)
 2000: Rent a Friend
 2004: Simon
 2006: Escort
 2008: Tiramisu
 2009: Kan door huid heen (Can Go Through Skin)
 2012: Hemel (Heaven)
 2014: Jongens (Boys)
 2015: Public Works
 2016: Tonio
 2017: Verdwijnen (Disappearance)
 2018: Fenix
 2020: Ares

References

External links 

 

1972 births
Living people
20th-century Dutch actresses
21st-century Dutch actresses
Dutch film actresses
Golden Calf winners
Dutch people of Jewish descent